Lviv Stadium may refer to:

Arena Lviv, a football stadium opened in 2011 in Lviv, Ukraine, and home of FC Lviv and Rukh Lviv
Ukraina Stadium, a stadium opened in 1963 and mainly used as the home of FC Karpaty Lviv

See also
 Lviv (disambiguation)